The Gymnastics competitions in the 1961 Summer Universiade were held in Sofia, Bulgaria.

Men's events

Women's events

References
 Universiade gymnastics medalists on HickokSports

1961 in gymnastics
1961 Summer Universiade
Gymnastics at the Summer Universiade